Nakachi (written: 中地) is a Japanese surname. Notable people with the surname include:

, Ryukyuan scholar-bureaucrat, physician, and surgeon
, Japanese footballer

Japanese-language surnames